Levin Zhu Yunlai (born 1957) is a Chinese businessman. He is the eldest son of Zhu Rongji, a former Premier of the People's Republic of China. In 1994, he graduated from the University of Wisconsin, studying atmospheric science.

In 1998, Zhu was invited by Wang Qishan to join China International Capital Corporation, which was then fledgling investment bank based in China, with Morgan Stanley as a shareholder. Zhu served as CEO of the firm between 2004 and 2014.

Zhu and his father, Zhu Rongji, by family tradition, are descendants of Zhu Yuanzhang, the Hongwu Emperor, the founding emperor of the Ming dynasty, through the line of Zhu Pian, Zhu Yuanzhang's 18th son.

References

1957 births
Living people
Zhu Rongji family
Businesspeople from Changsha
 University of Wisconsin–Madison College of Letters and Science alumni